Matisia is a genus of flowering plants in the family Malvaceae sensu lato or Bombacaceae.

Species include:
 Matisia alata
 Matisia castano
 Matisia coloradorum Benoist
Matisia cordata Bonpl.
 Matisia exalata
 Matisia grandifolia – Molinillo
 Matisia palenquiana
 Matisia stenopetala

References

 
Malvaceae genera
Taxa named by Aimé Bonpland
Taxonomy articles created by Polbot